Marie-France Lalonde  (born ) is a Franco-Ontarian politician in Ontario, Canada who has served as the Member of Parliament (MP) for the riding of Orléans as a member of the Liberal Party of Canada since 2019. She also served as the Liberal Member of Provincial Parliament (MPP) for the provincial riding of Orléans from 2014 until 2019, when she resigned her seat to run federally. She then won in her riding with 54 percent of the vote.

In January 2017, she was appointed as Minister of Community Safety and Correctional Services. In July 2017, she was appointed as the first Minister of Francophone Affairs. She served in those roles until the end of the government of Kathleen Wynne. She previously served as Minister of Government and Consumer Services and as Minister Responsible for Francophone Affairs in the cabinet of Kathleen Wynne.

Background
Lalonde was born in Ottawa, Ontario, and she grew up in Gatineau, Quebec. She attended Collège de l'Outaouais and later the University of Ottawa. She worked for the Children's Hospital of Eastern Ontario and the Ottawa Hospital, and she is a co-owner of Portobello Manor, a senior's residence. She lives in Orleans, Ontario, with her husband Alvaro and their daughter Monica.

Politics

Provincial politics

Lalonde ran in the 2014 provincial election as the Liberal candidate in the riding of Ottawa—Orléans. She defeated Progressive Conservative candidate Andrew Lister by 11,472 votes.

She was the Parliamentary Assistant to the Minister of Economic Development, Employment and Infrastructure, focusing on economic development issues. She was also the Parliamentary Assistant to Madeleine Meilleur in her capacity as responsible for francophone affairs. On September 2, 2015, she was appointed as Chief Government Whip and served until her appointment to cabinet.

In June 2016, she was appointed to cabinet as the Minister of Government and Consumer Services and the Minister Responsible for Francophone Affairs on June 13, 2016. On January 12, 2017, she was moved to the position of Minister of Community Safety and Correctional Services, replacing David Orazietti, who resigned unexpectedly in December 2016. In July 2017, she was created the Minister of Francophone Affairs.

In March 2015, she introduced a Private Member's Bill to the Legislative Assembly of Ontario, Bill 75, which would ban the production and addition of microbeads to cosmetic products in Ontario. Ontario was the first provincial jurisdiction to address the growing concern of microbeads. In June 2015, Bill 75 went to public hearings at committee.

In March 2016, Lalonde introduced a motion that sought to have a monument to the first two female MPPs elected to the Ontario Legislature erected on the grounds of the legislature. The motion was debated on March 22, 2016, and received unanimous support from all three parties.

As Minister of Government and Consumer Services, she introduced Bill 59, Putting Consumers First Act, which introduced regulations for door-to-door sales, home inspectors and further regulations for alternative financial services.

In November 2017, she introduced legislation leading to a wholesale reform of the Police Services Act. This act was informed by public consultation and a report by Justice Tulloch. The reforms introduced greater oversight for police, and significant changes to how police will operate in the province.

On March 20, 2018, she introduced Bill 6 - the Correctional Services Transformation Act, 2018. It passed Third Reading in the Legislative Assembly of Ontario, and received Royal Assent on May 7, 2018. The Act will result in improved conditions, increased transparency, and will apply a consistent and evidence-based approach to rehabilitation and reintegration to better prepare those in custody for a successful and well-supported return to their communities. The Act transform Ontario's adult correctional system by setting rules and clearly defining segregation, improving conditions of confinement, increasing transparency and accountability, ensuring incarcerated individuals have access to appropriate health care services, and better supporting rehabilitation and reintegration.

In a 2017 episode of the television series Political Blind Date, Lalonde and Cheri DiNovo discussed their differing perspectives on the issue of criminal justice and corrections.

Federal politics

On May 13, 2019, Lalonde announced that she would be running for the federal Liberal Party's nomination in the 2019 federal election to attempt to succeed retiring MP Andrew Leslie in Orléans. She won the nomination on September 19 and resigned her seat the next day.

On October 21, Lalonde won the riding of Orléans with 54 per cent of the vote.

On March 19, 2021, in Prime Minister Trudeau’s Cabinet Shuffle, Marie France was appointed to the post of Parliamentary Secretary to the Minister of Economic Development and Official Languages

Cabinet positions

Electoral record

Federal

Provincial

References

External links

1971 births
Living people
Businesspeople from Ottawa
Members of the Executive Council of Ontario
Ontario Liberal Party MPPs
Politicians from Ottawa
Women MPPs in Ontario
Women government ministers of Canada
Members of the House of Commons of Canada from Ontario
Women members of the House of Commons of Canada
Liberal Party of Canada MPs
21st-century Canadian politicians
21st-century Canadian women politicians